Henry Stephen Kemble (15 September 1789 – 22 June 1836) was a British actor and son of Stephen Kemble.

Kemble was born in Villiers Street, Strand, London. He was educated at Winchester College and Trinity College, Cambridge, which he quit after two years' residence to try his fortune on the stage, travelling with his father.

During his father's management of Drury Lane (1818–1819), Kemble played several important roles, for which he seemed rather unqualified.

Notes

1789 births
1836 deaths
Male actors from London